The coastal plain apamea (Melanapamea mixta, formerly Apamea mixta) is a moth of the family Noctuidae. It is found in scattered populations from Ontario, Quebec, New Brunswick, Nova Scotia and Manitoba in Canada south along the coast to New Jersey and North Carolina. Also inland in New York and western Maryland. It has also been reported from Massachusetts, Maine, Michigan and Ohio.

The larvae probably feed on grasses or sedges.

External links
Species info
Image

Hadeninae
Moths of North America